Aves is an industrial town and civil parish (freguesia) in northern Portugal. The population in 2011 was 8,458, in an area of 6.16 km². It is located in the municipality of Santo Tirso, 6 km to the northeast of the municipality seat, the city of Santo Tirso proper, bordering the parish of Lordelo in the municipality of Guimarães. Aves is nowadays, after Santo Tirso itself, the most important town in the municipality of Santo Tirso.

Sports
The local football team of Clube Desportivo das Aves was promoted to the Portuguese Liga in 2006 and 2017.

References

Freguesias of Santo Tirso